"This Place Is Empty" is a song from the Rolling Stones' 2005 album A Bigger Bang. It is the first of two songs on the album sung by Keith Richards, the other being "Infamy".

In promotional video on the Rolling Stones official website, Richards stated the song started one evening in his Connecticut home when his wife was out without him. He said he was sitting on a couch with the guitar and the song sparked. The final version is a bittersweet ballad where Richards pines for his familiar face:

It was formally recorded in Mick Jagger's estate in France. The song is notable for its clear piano opening and raspy vocal imprint. Largely an acoustic song, Richards performs guitar with Jagger performing slide guitar. Richards also performs bass and piano for the recording. Jagger played drums on the original recording, but Charlie Watts' drumming was later added.

The song was played on certain dates of the 2006 A Bigger Bang Tour set list, often alongside "Happy".

"This Place Is Empty" has been covered by Belgian singer Gilles Snowcat on his album You've Been Unboxing Gilles Snowcat in 2020.

References

The Rolling Stones songs
2005 songs
Songs written by Jagger–Richards
Song recordings produced by Don Was